The year 636 BC was a year of the pre-Julian Roman calendar. In the Roman Empire, it was known as year 118 Ab urbe condita . The denomination 636 BC for this year has been used since the early medieval period, when the Anno Domini calendar era became the prevalent method in Europe for naming years.

Events
 Duke Wen of Jin becomes ruler of the State of Jin in Zhou Dynasty China.

Births

Deaths

References